Mahmud Shahi (also Romanized as Maḩmūd Shāhī; also known as Maḩmūd Shādī) is a village in Tiab Rural District, in the Central District of Minab County, Hormozgan Province, Iran. At the 2006 census, its population was 77, in 14 families.

References 

Populated places in Minab County